Eastern Aleutian Tribes (EAT) was formed in 1991 and includes seven Aleut tribes from the Aleutian Islands and Alaska Peninsula.

Origins and development
Eastern Aleutian Tribes includes the Agdaagux Tribal Council (King Cove), Akutan Traditional Council (Akutan), Nelson Lagoon Tribal Council (Nelson Lagoon), Unga Tribal Council (Unga in Sand Point), Qagan Tayagungin Tribal Council (Sand Point), False Pass Tribal Council (False Pass) and the Pauloff Harbor Tribal Council (Sanak in Sand Point).

EAT provides medical, dental, optometric, and behavioral health services in federally qualified health centers in the communities of Adak, Akutan, Cold Bay, False Pass, King Cove, Nelson Lagoon, Sand Point, St. George, and Whittier.  This comprises over 100,000 square miles of remote territory.

From its roots as a small Native health organization, EAT has matured into a progressive Native health organization within the Alaska Tribal Health System.  EAT started out with a handful of employees and a budget under $500,000.  It has grown into a corporation with over 100 employees and an operating budget of $9.2 million, offering professional health services utilizing physicians (MD's and DO's,) mid-level practitioners (PA's and NP's) and Community Health Aides / Practitioners. (CHaP's)

EAT intends to continue to improve services in all aspects of health care, supporting the well-being of the Aleut people.

References

 Guidestar.org
 Anthctoday.org Newsletter Oct-Dec 2011
 AleutiansEast.org
 IHS.gov

External links
 

1991 establishments in Alaska
Aleut
Alaska Native tribes
Aleutians East Borough, Alaska
Buildings and structures in Aleutians West Census Area, Alaska
Healthcare in Alaska
Medical and health organizations based in Alaska
Non-profit organizations based in Anchorage, Alaska
Organizations established in 1991
Health centers